This is a list of people who have served as Lord Lieutenant of County Monaghan.

There were lieutenants of counties in Ireland until the reign of James II, when they were renamed governors. The office of Lord Lieutenant was recreated on 23 August 1831.

Governors

 Edward Blayney, 1st Baron Blayney 1604– (died 1629)
 Cadwallader Blayney, 7th Baron Blayney c.1713–
 Charles Talbot Blayney, 8th Baron Blayney c.1735–
 William Fortescue, 1st Earl of Clermont: 1775–1806
 Warner Westenra, 2nd Baron Rossmore: –1831
 Charles Powell Leslie: 1802–1831

Lord Lieutenants
 The 2nd Baron Rossmore: 7 October 1831 – 1836
 The 3rd Baron Rossmore: 13 June 1836 – 6 December 1858
 Charles Powell Leslie: 1858 – 26 June 1871
 The 1st Earl of Dartrey: 18 October 1871 – 12 May 1897
 The 5th Baron Rossmore: 18 June 1897 – 31 January 1921
 Sir John Leslie, 2nd Bt.: 18 March 1921 – 1922

References

Monaghan